William Warner Cate (September 1, 1870 – January 8, 1927) was an American politician. He was a member of the Arkansas House of Representatives, serving from 1895 to 1896 and from 1903 to 1907 He was a member of the Democratic party.

References

1927 deaths
1870 births
Politicians from Jonesboro, Arkansas
Speakers of the Arkansas House of Representatives
Democratic Party members of the Arkansas House of Representatives